Carl Schulz (11 August 1901 – 9 March 1971) was a German international footballer.

References

1901 births
1971 deaths
Association football forwards
German footballers
Germany international footballers
Holstein Kiel players